Richard Lee "Rick" Mewborn (born March 28, 1965) is an American former ski jumper. He competed in the 1988 Winter Olympics and placed 54th in the normal hill.

Mewborn won the U.S. titles in the normal hill in 1986 and in the large hill in 1987. He took up ski jumping at Howelsen Hill in Colorado, and later trained ski jumpers there. He also runs an excavation company. Mewborn is a member of the American Ski Jumping Hall of Fame.

References

1965 births
Living people
People from Carlsbad, New Mexico
American male ski jumpers
Olympic ski jumpers of the United States
Ski jumpers at the 1988 Winter Olympics